Larry Derryberry (April 22, 1939 – November 19, 2016) was an American politician who served in the Oklahoma House of Representatives from 1963 to 1971 and as the Attorney General of Oklahoma from 1971 to 1979.

He died on November 19, 2016, in Oklahoma City, Oklahoma at age 77.

References

1939 births
2016 deaths
20th-century Members of the Oklahoma House of Representatives
Oklahoma Attorneys General
Democratic Party members of the Oklahoma House of Representatives